15268 Wendelinefroger, provisional designation , is a stony, spheroidal, and binary Nysian asteroid from the inner regions of the asteroid belt, approximately 3.4 kilometers in diameter.

It was discovered on 18 November 1990, by Belgian astronomer Eric Elst at ESO's La Silla Observatory in northern Chile, and named after Belgian singer Wendeline Froger.

Orbit 

The S-type asteroid orbits the Sun in the inner main-belt at a distance of 1.8–2.9 AU once every 3 years and 8 months (1,329 days). Its orbit has an eccentricity of 0.23 and an inclination of 3° with respect to the ecliptic.

Physical characteristics

Primary 

In October 2008, a rotational lightcurve was obtained from photometric observations at the Leura Observatory, Australia. It gave a rotation period of 2.422 hours with a low brightness variation of 0.07 magnitude, which indicates that the asteroid is of nearly spheroidal shape. The Collaborative Asteroid Lightcurve Link (CALL) assumes a standard albedo for stony asteroids of 0.20 and calculates a diameter of 3.4 kilometer with an absolute magnitude of 14.7.

Secondary 

During the photometric observations in 2008, a minor-planet moon was also discovered, orbiting Wendelinefroger every  hours at a distance of 8.7 kilometers. Based on mutual occultations of Wendelinefroger and its moon, the diameter ratio for the two bodies is at least 0.24 (i.e. secondary-to-primary mean-diameter ratio), which translates into an estimated diameter of 0.8 kilometer or more for the asteroid's moon, using CALL's calculated diameter for the primary.

Naming 

This minor planet is named in honour of Belgian female singer Wendeline Froger (b. 1948), who has a soprano voice and performs at church celebrations, weddings and for selected audiences at her residence. She has a preference to sing Lieder by Robert Schumann, after whom the minor planet 4003 Schumann is named. The approved naming citation was published by the Minor Planet Center on 12 December 2008.

Notes

References

External links 
 CBET 1542, Central Bureau for Astronomical Telegrams, 20 October 2008
 Asteroids with Satellites, Robert Johnston, johnstonsarchive.net
 Asteroid Lightcurve Database (LCDB), query form (info )
 Dictionary of Minor Planet Names, Google books
 Asteroids and comets rotation curves, CdR – Observatoire de Genève, Raoul Behrend
 Discovery Circumstances: Numbered Minor Planets (15001)-(20000) – Minor Planet Center
 
 

015268
Discoveries by Eric Walter Elst
Named minor planets
015268
19901118